Babia Wieś street is a half-kilometer long alley, extending along the Brda river, close to downtown Bydgoszcz. The path is noticeable by the presence of various tenements, whose construction dates stretch from the late 1890s to the 1930s.

Location
Located in the Babia Wieś district, the street runs between Toruńska Street and the Brda river, following a west/east route. With a curved shape, it crosses Toruńska Street at both of its tips. 

The name Babia Wieś refers to the district of the same name. It harks back to the location of a former settlement where earlier was situated the garden of the Bydgoszcz castle.

History 

The "Babia Wieś" settlement, east of the Old Town in Bydgoszcz, dates back to the times when the city stronghold -from the times of the first Piasts- used to stand.
To the east of the castle, a suburban colony was established, close to the Brda river where fish were caught and along which a fertile soil could be ploughed. In the area of ​​the settlement, a church was erected in the 13th century. In the 14th century, once the castle completed, craftsmen, their families and the military lived in Babia Wieś. From 1661, written documents certifies that the area is identified as a suburb of Bydgoszcz, sometimes named as "Przedmieście Kujawskie-Toruńskie".

In 1480, a Bernardine Monastery was erected to the east of the castle. A wall-fenced garden was arranged east of this monastery: in order to protect it against flooding, it was surrounded by a dyke and drainage ditches were dug.

The territory had long been exploited for its salt mines: a manor inn and two houses were built there in 1744.

In the 19th century, very few buildings were standing in the street. On Lindner's map from 1800, one can spot farm estates and some backyards from several-story residential houses giving onto Toruńska Street. During Prussian period (1772-1918) and the occupation, the street bore the name of Schiffer Straße.

At the beginning of the 20th century, a dozen of marinas were created along the right bank of the river Brda. Today, several rowing clubs are still active in the area, among which "Bydgoski Klub Wioślarek", "Bydgoskie Towarzystwo Wioślarskie" or "Bydgostia Bydgoszcz". This part of the city between Toruńska street and the Brda river is nicknamed the "Rowing district".

After World War II, in the years 1952–1953, a new tram line was opened, connecting the Old Town with Kapuściska and Łęgnowo districts. Its tracks ran between Babia Wieś street and the river, and a terminus was built east of the street.

The traffic was stopped in fall of 2017, following the impacts of the construction of a 15-storey facility on the river bank by the firm Nordic Astrum. During the first building works, street ground was displaced, resulting in a small landslide that fissured the house at 8 Babia Wieś street, damaged the road surface, unsealed a gas pipeline and weakened the foundations of the tram track.

Main areas and edifices

House at 1a 
This tiny house sheltered from 1973 to 2016, the activities of the "Underwater Archeology club Tryton".

The club gathered divers and archaeologists interested in underwater archaeological research; it cooperated with Andrzej Kola and Gerard Wilke, from the Nicolaus Copernicus University in Toruń (UMK), Olga Romanowska-Grabowska, a researcher from Bydgoszcz, prof. Zbigniew Bukowski from the Institute of the History of Material Culture of the Polish Academy of Sciences and Olga Romanowska-Grabowska from the office of the Provincial Conservator of Monuments. 

The peak of his activity took place in the 1970s and the beginning of the 1980s. Among "Tryton"'s finds, one can cite:
 a dugout canoe in the lake of Wielkie Gacno;
 a 4-meter-long boat from the lake Ostrowite near Chojnice;
 wooden structures from an early medieval settlement in lake Łąkorek;
 a wooden palisade, the remains of a wooden bridge as well as Roman stone blocks in a lake near Mogilno;
 a medieval keep, remains of an early medieval stronghold and Lusatian culture artifacts in lake Wolskie;
 limestone kilns and two wooden platforms in the Gąsawka river.
The club also participated in the research of the Solena wreck conducted by the Central Maritime Museum in Gdańsk.

At the end of the 1980s, club divings abated. In the 1990s and the 2000s, its activity was almost non-existent. Despite a will to reinvigorate the association in 2010, it was dismantled in 2016.

Boathouses along the bank of the Brda river 
One building is registered on Kuyavian-Pomeranian Voivodeship heritage list, Nr.601263, A/1103, November 19, 1993

1933-1937

In early 1910, several rowing were established in then Bromberg, along the right bank of the Brda river. Among them, the following ones are still active:
 Bydgoszcz Rowing Club was founded on January 25, 1926. It was and remains a women-only rowing club. Till 1920, the club used a riverside dwelling belonging to the "State Agricultural School" at 6/8 Bernardyńska Street. In 1934, the club received on a perpetual lease the current plot along the river: a rowing marina was erected in 1936. It has been serving the association to this day.
 Uczniowski Klub Sportowy-UKS Kopernik Bydgoszcz is a canoeing club established in 1994. It uses the facilities at 5 Babia Wieś street. The initial patronage of the club was carried out by the "Łączność" multi-sports club (1933-2006).

House at 4 / 11 Toruńska Street
End of 19th century

Eclecticism

This building displays a facade on Toruńska Street and a backyard on Babia Wieś street.

Tenement at 4a 
Mid 1930s

Modernism

Initial address was "22 Schiffer straße".

Tenements at 5 to 23 
1925-1927, by Bogdan Raczkowski

Modernism

This housing estate was built in the second half of the 1920s, after a decision of the municipal authorities. At the time, the numbering of the ensemble was "3a" to "3d".

Each building was designed with a rectangular strip of land for the cultivation of vegetables and flowers in the backyard. On both sides of the arched entrances, one can notice loggias. Furthermore, the facades display remarkable ogee wall gables.
A renovation has been launched by the city in 2020 and will last several years.

Tenement at 6 / 15 Toruńska Street
1890s

The first registered landlord of the building at then "6 Toruńska" and previously "6 Thornerstraβe" was Carl Bennewitz, a wheel craftsman producing wagons. 

The ensemble has an elevation onto Toruńska Street (Nr.15) and the courtyard housing the ancient brick workshop onto Babia Wieś street.

Tenement at 10 
End of 19th century

Eclecticism

Initially located at "19 Schifferstraβe", Jakob Michalski, a grocery merchant was the first owner.

The faded façade still offers some details of eclectic architecture: bossage, brick pediments, cartouches and top  corbel tables.

Real estate at 12 
2022

Modern architecture

On the plot, occupied since the mid 1850s, has been constructed a brand new tenement unveiled in 2022. Design has been realized by the firm Spółdzielnia Mieszkaniowa „Nad Brdą”.

Tenement at 14 
End of 19th century

Eclecticism

The house was registered at its erection at "16/17 Schifferstraβe": it was he property of Eleonore and Wilhlem Bublitz. The latter was a railway worker.

The backyard of the house harbors a commercial workshop.

Building at 20 
2022 

The edifice is an extension of the Sue Ryder's "Psychoneurology Center for old age" ("") at 29 Toruńska. The recently added facility at 20 Babia Wieś street is a Day Care Center ("").

As of today (2022)),the Sue Ryder Foundation has established nearly 30 centers in Poland. These homes provide support and care for the sick and the disabled. The vast majority of these houses have their own specialization.

In addition, 14 "Sue Ryder Houses" operate in Poland, specifically caring for cancer patients. 
In 1963, the first one was established in Bydgoszcz, built at "Dr Jurasz University Hospital Nr. 1". The second one was established at the Oncologic center in Fordon district.

Tenement at 22 
1930

Modernism

The area was a garden from the late 19th century to the 1920s, extending between Toruńska and Babia Wieś streets. In 1930, the plot was acquired by Jan Tykwiński, who had the tenement constructed.

Although badly damaged, the house mirrors other modernist edifices from the similar period in Bydgoszcz, like in Asnyka  or in Chodkiewicza streets.

Villa at 37 Toruńska street, corner with Babia Wieś street

ca 1897

Eclecticism

Dated from 1897, as mentioned on the facade pediment, the villa was owned by a butcher, Richard Fröhlich. At the time, its address was 12 Thörnerstraße.

Renovated in 2021, the villa displays many architectural motifs, in particular a window above the entrance adorned with columns bearing lion's heads, a triangular gable and two urns standing at each extremity of the elevation.

See also 

 Bydgoszcz
 Bogdan Raczkowski
 Sue Ryder
  Babia Wieś district
  UKS Kopernik Bydgoszcz
  Bydgoski Klub Wioślarek (BKW)

References

Bibliography

External links
  Facebook page of BKW
  Facebook page of UKS Kopernik Bydgoszcz
  Firm Spółdzielnia Mieszkaniowa „Nad Brdą”
  Sue Ryder house in Bydgoszcz

Streets and squares in Bydgoszcz
Cultural heritage monuments in Bydgoszcz